The Zoological Journal of the Linnean Society is a monthly peer-reviewed scientific journal covering zoology published by Oxford University Press on behalf of the Linnean Society. The editor-in-chief is Maarten Christenhusz (Linnean Society). It was established in 1856 as the Journal of the Proceedings of the Linnean Society of London. Zoology and renamed Journal of the Linnean Society of London, Zoology in 1866. It obtained its current title in 1969.

Abstracting and indexing
The journal is abstracted and indexed in:

According to the Journal Citation Reports, the journal has a 2020 impact factor of 3.286.

References

External links

Zoology journals
Linnean Society of London
Monthly journals
Academic journals associated with learned and professional societies
Publications established in 1856